Deepwater Township is one of twenty-four townships in Bates County, Missouri, and is part of the Kansas City metropolitan area within the USA.  As of the 2000 census, its population was 247.

Deepwater Township took its name from a nearby creek.

Geography
According to the United States Census Bureau, Deepwater Township covers an area of 35.92 square miles (93.03 square kilometers); of this, 35.91 square miles (93 square kilometers, 99.97 percent) is land and 0.01 square miles (0.03 square kilometers, 0.03 percent) is water.

Unincorporated towns
 Spruce at 
(This list is based on USGS data and may include former settlements.)

Adjacent townships
 Spruce Township (north)
 Walker Township, Henry County (northeast)
 Hudson Township (south)
 Pleasant Gap Township (southwest)
 Summit Township (west)
 Shawnee Township (northwest)

Cemeteries
The township contains these four cemeteries: Radford, Smith, Snodgrass Union and White.

School districts
 Ballard R-II

Political districts
 Missouri's 4th congressional district
 State House District 120
 State Senate District 31

References
 United States Census Bureau 2008 TIGER/Line Shapefiles
 United States Board on Geographic Names (GNIS)
 United States National Atlas

External links
 US-Counties.com
 City-Data.com

Townships in Bates County, Missouri
Townships in Missouri